Parartocarpus is a genus of trees in the family Moraceae. It is dioecious, with male and female flowers borne on separate plants.

Species
The genus Parartocarpus contains the following two species:
Parartocarpus bracteata (King) Becc.
Parartocarpus venenosa (Zoll. & Moritzi) Becc.

References

 
Moraceae genera
Taxa named by Henri Ernest Baillon
Dioecious plants